Anarom (also Romanized as Anārom; also known as Anārūm) is a village in Rastupey Rural District, in the Central District of Savadkuh County, Mazandaran Province, Iran. At the 2006 census, its population was 158, in 43 families.

References 

Populated places in Savadkuh County